Adoro is a 1982 album of popular Mexican songs by Plácido Domingo.

Track listing
"Adoro" - Armando Manzanero
"Un viejo amor" - Adolfo Fernández / Alfonso Esparza Oteo
"Serenata tapatia" - Ernesto Cortázar / Manuel Esperón
"Adios mariquita Linda" - Marcos A. Jiménez
"La negra noche" 
"Las mañanitas a la Virgen" 
"El triste" - Roberto Cantoral
"Rayando el sol" 
"Noche plateada" - Pedro Infante
"China"
"Maria bonita" - Agustin Lara

References

1982 albums
Plácido Domingo albums